Marina was a Mexican telenovela directed by Jesús Valero for Televisa in 1974. It starred Silvia Derbez and Carlos Bracho.

Cast 
Silvia Derbez as Marina
Carlos Bracho
Julieta Bracho
Estela Chacón
Aurora Alvarado
Raúl Meraz
Jorge del Campo
Otto Sirgo
Claudio Obregón

References

External links 

Mexican telenovelas
1974 telenovelas
Televisa telenovelas
Spanish-language telenovelas
1974 Mexican television series debuts
1974 Mexican television series endings